Dumitru Târțău (born 24 November 1970) is a Romanian former footballer who played as a striker.

International career
Dumitru Târțău played one friendly game at international level for Romania, which ended with a 2–0 victory against Israel, when he came as a substitute and replaced Adrian Ilie in the 76th minute of the game.

Honours
UTA Arad
Divizia B: 1992–93
Rapid București
Cupa României: 1997–98
Supercupa României: 1999

Notes

References

External links

1970 births
Living people
Romanian footballers
Romania international footballers
Association football forwards
Liga I players
Liga II players
FC UTA Arad players
FC Rapid București players
ACF Gloria Bistrița players
ASC Daco-Getica București players
Footballers from Bucharest